Ensign is a hamlet in southern Alberta, Canada within Vulcan County.

The community was named for the Canadian Red Ensign.

Demographics 
The population of Ensign according to the 2007 municipal census conducted by Vulcan County is 26.

See also 
List of communities in Alberta
List of hamlets in Alberta

References 

Hamlets in Alberta
Vulcan County
Latter-day Saint settlements in Canada